The Belfast Journeymen Butchers' Association was a trade union in the United Kingdom. The union was established in 1891 and grew to a peak membership of 190 in 1910. It merged with the Amalgamated Transport and General Workers' Union (ATGWU) in 1937.

See also

 Transport and General Workers' Union
 TGWU amalgamations

References

Defunct trade unions of Ireland
Meat industry trade unions
Meat processing in the United Kingdom
Trade unions established in 1891
Trade unions disestablished in 1937
Trade unions in Northern Ireland
Transport and General Workers' Union amalgamations